Dehesa is a type of agricultural landscape of Spain and Portugal.

Dehesa may also refer to:

Places
Dehesa, California, in the Granite Hills and Alpine areas of San Diego County, California
Dehesa School District
Dehesa, Veracruz, municipality in the state of Veracruz, Mexico
Dehesa de Campoamor, a village in the municipality of Orihuela, Spain
Dehesa de Cuéllar, a hamlet in Cuéllar municipality, Spain
Dehesa de Montejo, a municipality located in the province of Palencia, Spain
Dehesa de Romanos, a municipality the province of Palencia, Spain
Dehesas Viejas, a municipality in the province of Granada, Spain
Dehesas de Guadix, a municipality located in the province of Granada, Spain
La Dehesa, suburban neighborhood of Santiago, Chile

People
Daniel Dehesa Mora (born 1950), Mexican politician
Francisco de la Dehesa, Spanish 17th-century sculptor
Germán Dehesa (1944–2010), Mexican journalist, academic and writer
Guillermo de la Dehesa (born 1941), Spanish lawyer, economist, and politician
Karl Dehesa, Filipino-American professional basketball player
Teodoro A. Dehesa Méndez, governor of the Mexican state of Veracruz (1892–1911)